Upper Boat Studios was a television studio complex leased to the BBC in mid-2006, and formerly operated by BBC Wales.

It is located in Upper Boat, a village on the outskirts of Pontypridd, Rhondda Cynon Taf, near Cardiff in Wales.

Facilities
At ten times larger than BBC Wales existing site at Llandaff, the Doctor Who residency at Upper Boat Studios included the use of its six sound stages.  Other facilities at Upper Boat included a large props store, workshops, and video editing suites.

History
By 2011, Doctor Who was the only programme still based at Upper Boat, following the move of several BBC Wales productions to the new permanent home at the new Roath Lock studios.  Doctor Who itself relocated to Roath Lock throughout 2012, with the last filming day at Upper Boat on 11 May 2012.

Despite the studio closure, production on Sherlock series 3 continued at the studios until September 2013.

Productions

Productions based at Upper Boat Studios

Productions partially filmed at Upper Boat Studios

See also

 Roath Lock

References

British television studios
Buildings and structures in Rhondda Cynon Taf
BBC offices, studios and buildings